Albrechtice v Jizerských horách is a municipality and village in Jablonec nad Nisou District in the Liberec Region of the Czech Republic. It has about 300 inhabitants.

Administrative parts
The hamlet of Mariánská Hora is an administrative part of Albrechtice v Jizerských horách.

Geography
It lies in the Jizera Mountains and the eponymous protected landscape area. The municipality is situated on the left bank of the Kamenice River, which flows briefly along the southern municipal border.

History
Albrechtice was founded in 1670 and named by its founder, count Albrecht Maximilian Desfours. The hamlet of Mariánská Hora was founded around 1700. The first inhabitants of the settlements engaged in logging and agriculture.

Sights
The landmark of the municipality is the Church of Saint Francis of Paola. It was built in 1779–1784. The church tower was added in 1898. The cemetery next to the church includes the valuable building of Schowanek's mausoleum built in 1935.

References

External links

Villages in Jablonec nad Nisou District